Stephenson 2 DFK 49 or St2-11 is a putative post red supergiant star in the constellation Scutum. It is located in the massive open cluster Stephenson 2. If the upper estimate is correct, then Stephenson 2 DFK 49 has a volume 2.2 billion times that of the Sun. If it was placed at the center of the Solar System, its photosphere will potentially approach or engulf Jupiter's orbit. It loses mass at a very high rate, resulting in large amounts of Infrared excess.

Observation history
The open cluster Stephenson 2 was discovered by American astronomer Charles Bruce Stephenson in 1990 in the data obtained by a deep infrared survey.  The cluster is also known as RSGC2, one of several massive open clusters in Scutum, each containing multiple red supergiants. The 49th brightest star in the K band was given an identifier number of 49.
The authors noted that the star likely had significant circumstellar and interstellar extinction, higher than even the other cluster members, and noted that its spectral type places it near yellow hypergiants on the Hertzsprung–Russell diagram (HR Diagram), though not as hot. 

In a later study from 2010, the same star was given the identifier number 11, and was grouped with a proposed cluster assumed to be associated with Stephenson 2, Stephenson 2-SW. The star showed maser emissions at some spectral lines. A later study corroborates this. The study mentions a weak CO emission with radial velocities similar to Stephenson 2 DFK 49, but it is said to be unrelated due to being too intense for a red supergiant at Stephenson 2 DFK 49’s distance. 
Another study studied 57 red supergiant stars across the galaxy and gave estimates of the stars' properties based on their Spectral Energy Distributions, like luminosity and temperature.
In 2016, it was compared to the yellow hypergiant star IRAS 18357-0604,which can be found in the same general region as Stephenson 2.
A recent study on red supergiant mass loss rates and histories notes it as the most interesting object in the cluster, because its spectral energy distribution which has an infrared excess is similar to that of the famous and extreme red hypergiant VY Canis Majoris, although Stephenson 2 DFK 49 is hotter. This indicates that the star has a large amount of circumstellar extinction. The study also estimates the possible mass loss rates of the star, as well as its other properties.

Properties
Stephenson 2 DFK 49 was known to be an interesting object since its home cluster was first studied in depth. Interestingly, Stephenson 2 DFK 49 appears to be at the center of a bow-shock structure in infrared images.  Its properties, an earlier than usual spectral type compared to other stars in Stephenson 2, its luminosity and position on the HR Diagram indicate that it is similar to the extreme yellow hypergiant star IRC+10420 and Variable A in the Triangulum Galaxy (M33). Stephenson 2 DFK 49 comparable to another extreme star in the vicinity of Stephenson 2, IRAS 18357-0604. Both are possible post-red supergiant stars, and both of them are comparable to the yellow hypergiant IRC+10420.

Luminosity
A 2012 study estimated and published the properties of numerous red supergiants and other supergiant stars. The study estimated Stephenson 2-11's luminosity at a much lower , using Spectral Energy Distributions.
However, it is noted that the estimated luminosity may be an underestimate, because it does not include excess radiation from warm dust.

Temperature and Spectrum
A more recent study estimated the star's temperature at a hotter , based on its spectral type of K4. 
Stephenson 2 DFK 49's spectrum is similar to that of VY Canis Majoris, but it is somewhat hotter.

Size
Applying the Stefan-Boltzmann law, Stephenson 2 DFK 49’s radius would be , making it one of the largest stars known. A 2012 study published the estimated properties of numerous red supergiants and other supergiant stars using Spectral Energy Distributions, including Stephenson 2 DFK 49. The study estimates its temperature at a slightly cooler  but its luminosity at a much lower . This would imply a radius of only , smaller than the radius implied by Davies (2007). Applying the Stefan-Boltzmann law, its radius would be  , larger than the other two estimates.

Mass loss and maser emissions
While Davies (2007) does not estimate a mass loss rate for Stephenson 2 DFK 49, the study mentions that it would be interesting to estimate its mass loss rate. In 2012, it was noted for having maser emissions at some spectral lines.  A 2020 study later determines a mass loss rate of 1.3-7*10-4 per year based on several computer models, but it is noted that these rates are not high for other hypergiant stars such as VY Canis Majoris, NML Cygni and IRC+10420. As a possible post-red supergiant star, Stephenson 2 DFK 49 likely experiences both constant and variable mass-loss rates.

Evolution and future

Because Stephenson 2 DFK 49 has lost so much mass and continues to do so as well as its likely status as a post-red supergiant star, it is likely on the verge of shedding all of its outer layers and becoming a luminous blue variable or a Wolf-Rayet star.

References 

Scutum (constellation)
J18390558-0604265
K-type supergiants
IRAS catalogue objects
TIC objects